The 1989–90 Texas Longhorns men's basketball team represented The University of Texas at Austin in intercollegiate basketball competition during the 1989–90 season. The Longhorns were led by second-year head coach Tom Penders. The team finished the season with a 24–9 overall record and finished third in Southwest Conference play with a 12–4 conference record. Texas advanced to the NCAA tournament for in consecutive seasons for the first time in school history, recording its fourth overall Elite Eight appearance and its first in 43 years. Texas finished the season ranked No. 12 in the postseason college basketball Coaches Poll.

Schedule and results

|-
!colspan=12 style="background:#CC5500; color:white;"| Regular season

|-
!colspan=12 style="background:#CC5500; color:white;"| 1990 Southwest Conference tournament

|-
!colspan=12 style="background:#CC5500; color:white;"| 1990 NCAA tournament

NBA draft

References

Texas Longhorns men's basketball seasons
Texas
Texas
Texas Longhorns Basketball Team
Texas Longhorns Basketball Team